The Council of International Students Australia, or CISA, is the peak representative body for international students in Australia. CISA was founded on 7 July 2010 in Hobart, Tasmania and provides member associations with representation to the Federal government, and peak bodies such as the Australian Research Council, English Australia, ACPET (Australian  Council  for  Private  Education  and  Training, TAFE Directors Australia and Universities Australia, on issues affecting international students in Australia.

Recognising the overlap between undergraduate, postgraduate, domestic and international students, CISA works in collaboration with the National Union of Students and Council of Australian Postgraduate Associations where matters impact on all students (such as voluntary student unionism and travel concessions).

History

Following the collapse of the National Liaison Committee for International Students in Australia in 2008, international students lacked a legitimate and credible national representative body to advocate on their behalf. In July 2010, 52 student, ethnic and community organisations gathered in Hobart, Tasmania to formally constitute a new peak representative organisation, CISA, at an Inaugural General Meeting (IGM).

The IGM was the culmination of two years of discussion among representative bodies and international students.  The process was supported by a working group of international student representatives from across Australia, convened at an international students' forum hosted in Melbourne in 2009. The 2010 Forum was hosted at the University of Tasmania and coincided with the Education Conference of the National Union of Students.  Around 80 international student representatives attended, from all states and all levels of post-secondary education.

References

External links
CISA website
Students Prefer Australia as a Study Destination
Expert Education

Education in Australia
Students' unions in Australia
Australia
Student politics in Australia
Groups of students' unions
Student migration
International education industry